Seymour High School is a public high school in Seymour, Indiana. It is the only high school in the Seymour Community Schools district.

History
Prior to 1870, an iron fence separated a tract of forest land from the growing town of Seymour. In that year the tree-covered plot was leased by the town school board and work began on a three-story brick building facing the east. The heirs of Captain Meedy Shields later gave this land to the city for school purposes.

Here stood the first Shields High School, surrounded by trees and for many years bordered on the west by a pond. On the first floor were two grade rooms and the public library; on the second, two grade rooms and the superintendent's office; and on the third, the music room and the assembly room.

In 1876 there had been an addition of six rooms, but the growing population of Seymour now demanded even more space if the supply of rooms was to meet the needs of the pupils. In 1911, a new school building arose on the foundations of the old. This building is the one which houses the Shields Junior High School today.

It was not long until sports and inter-school competition came into prominence. By 1922 students and citizens alike complained of the smallness of the Shields gymnasium, so in 1922 a south wing was added to the school. This contained an auditorium-gymnasium and above it six classrooms.

In the middle of the 1930s sports fans again began to clamor for a gymnasium big enough to house all the Owl supporters and in November 1937 a fire-proof structure with a capacity of 3308 was begun as a WPA project. The seating capacity was later expanded to 3800.

The 9th grade remained, along with grades 7 and 8, in the Shields High School facilities and became known as the Shields Junior High School. In addition to classroom and laboratory facilities, the new two-story building contained the school's administrative ad guidance offices, a 110-seat library, an 1100-seat auditorium, and a 300-seat cafeteria. In 1960 the football stadium and an all-purpose track were added to the high school campus. In 1968 work began on a new gymnasium, indoor swimming pool, and a separate academic facility consisting of ten classrooms, two science labs, and two industrial arts labs. These new facilities were ready for occupancy in the fall of 1970, and at that time, ninth grade students again became part of the high school. The gymnasium, dedicated in 1970, seats 8,228 and ranks as the largest high school gym in the United States. It was renamed in honor of Lloyd E. Scott in 1998, who coached the boys’ basketball team from 1961-1974. A fourth building, the power heating plant, varsity and reserve baseball diamonds, and eight tennis courts are also located on campus.

In 1988, the library and business classrooms above the library were renovated and enlarged, and an additional computer lab was constructed for the business department. In 1992, the guidance and administrative offices were renovated and enlarged. In 1997 a two-year, $18 million renovation and building expansion project that included the construction of a new auxiliary gym, a new science wing, a hallway linkage between the original building and the 1968 building, and extensive remodeling of all classrooms, the cafeteria, and the Earl D. Prout was completed. In the spring of 2000 ground was broken on a major renovation of the stadium including the remodeling of locker rooms and the construction of a new weight and training room.

In 2007, the girls softball facility was completely remodeled including the construction of dugouts and an announcers' booth. An indoor multi-purpose athletic facility was also constructed adjacent to the varsity baseball field.

In 2011, due to a flood, the street in front of the Auditorium had to be removed and replaced.

In 2016, a new turf soccer field and stadium were built on the west side of the school grounds. A turf football field was also installed, replacing the natural grass that once supported the football stadium.

Demographics
The demographic breakdown of the 1,239 students enrolled in 2012–2013 was:
 Male - 51.7%
 Female - 48.3%
 Native American/Alaskan - 0.2%
 Asian/Pacific islanders - 0.7%
 Black - 1.2%
 Hispanic - 2.3%
 White - 95.2%
 Multiracial - 0.4%

42.7% of the students were eligible for free or reduced lunch.

Athletics
The Seymour Owls play in the Hoosier Hills Conference. The following IHSAA sports are offered:

 Baseball (boys)
 State champion - 1988
 Basketball (boys & girls)
 Cross country (boys & girls)
 Football (boys)
 Golf (boys & girls)
 Boys state champion - 1990
 Girls state champion - 1989
 Gymnastics (girls)
 Soccer (boys & girls)
 Softball (girls)
 Swimming (boys & girls)
 Tennis (boys & girls)
 Track (boys & girls)
 Volleyball (girls)
 Wrestling (boys)

Notable people

Faculty
 Bob Lochmueller, NBA player, head basketball coach 1957–1961

Alumni
 Pat Calhoun - Olympic swimmer
 Brian Fish - basketball head coach, Montana State
 Daniel M. Fleetwood - scientist and inventor
 Thomas M. Honan - Speaker of the Indiana House of Representatives and Indiana Attorney General
 John Mellencamp - musician
 Katie Stam - Miss America 2009
 Mark Sciarra - professional wrestler, better known as "Rip Rogers"
 Teri Moren, Indiana university basketball women's coach, has taken Indiana university to 2 straight sweet sixteen appearances, leading Indiana women's to their highest regular season rank (5), and highest NCAA women's tournament rank (3)

See also
 List of high schools in Indiana
 List of largest high school gyms in the United States

References

External links
 Seymour Community Schools
 

Buildings and structures in Jackson County, Indiana
Public high schools in Indiana
1870 establishments in Indiana
Educational institutions established in 1870